BoB and Partners Co. Ltd. was a former Hong Kong production company. It was established by famed filmmakers Wong Jing, Manfred Wong and Andrew Lau during the success of the Young and Dangerous series The "BoB" of the title stands for 'Best of the Best.'

Company
Currently affiliated with Fortune Star, the company is best known for their opening credit flourish set to the "Best Partners" tune of Aces Go Places fame.

The first film from BoB was Young and Dangerous 2. It went on to produce the rest of the Young and Dangerous films, as well as its spin-offs, including other films such as The Storm Riders, and God of Gamblers 3: The Early Stage.

References

Mass media companies established in 1995
Film production companies of Hong Kong

1996 establishments in Hong Kong
2003 disestablishments in Hong Kong